Thomas Oude Kotte (born 20 March 1996) is a Dutch professional footballer who plays as a centre-back for Eerste Divisie club Telstar.

Club career

Vitesse
In 2008, Oude Kotte joined Vitesse from local side Groen Wit '62. On 19 April 2016, after impressing at youth level, Oude Kotte made his senior debut against PSV replacing Japanese full-back Kosuke Ota in the 90th minute. On 1 May 2016, Oude Kotte was given his first Vitesse start in a 3–1 defeat against Utrecht, in which he featured for the entirety of the fixture along with Julian Lelieveld.

Ahead of the 2016–17 campaign, Oude Kotte was promoted to the Vitesse first-team along with several other academy teammates including Arshak Koryan, Mitchell van Bergen, Zhang Yuning, Jeroen Houwen and Julian Lelieveld. Along with his promotion, Oude Kotte was reassigned the number 22, after holding the number 44 last season. However, following the arrival of Henk Fraser, Oude Kotte was demoted back to the reserve squad and failed to make a senior appearance all season.

Following several substitute appearances, Oude Kotte made his return to the first-team squad, during Vitesse's 1–0 home victory over French side, Nice in their UEFA Europa League group-stage campaign, featuring for the full 90 minutes. On 29 March 2018, Oude Kotte was offered a new deal, however, opted to reject it to pursue a career abroad and in turn leave in June 2018.

Excelsior
Despite expressing his desire to move abroad, Oude Kotte opted to join fellow Eredivisie side, Excelsior on a three-year deal in June 2018.

Vendsyssel
On 23 July 2021, Oude Kotte moved to Denmark, where he signed a two-year deal with Danish 1st Division club Vendsyssel FF. A year later, in June 2022, Vendsyssel announced the departure of Kotte.

Telstar
Oude Kotte returned to the Netherlands after one season, signing a one-year contract with Eerste Divisie club Telstar.

Career statistics

References

External links
 
 

1996 births
Living people
Sportspeople from Apeldoorn
Association football defenders
Dutch footballers
Dutch expatriate footballers
Eredivisie players
SBV Vitesse players
Excelsior Rotterdam players
Vendsyssel FF players
SC Telstar players
Dutch expatriate sportspeople in Denmark
Expatriate men's footballers in Denmark
Footballers from Gelderland